Calvin "Shakes" Schexnayder (born November 11, 1969) is a former American football wide receiver in the Arena Football League. He played college football at Washington State.

Schexnayder played for the Arizona Rattlers, Tampa Bay Storm, San Jose SaberCats.

Early life
Schexnayder attended Bullard High School in Fresno, California.

College career

Fresno City College
Upon his graduation in 1988, Schexnayder enrolled at Fresno City College, where he played football for the Rams during the 1988 and 1989 football seasons.

Washington State
Schexnayder attended Washington State University on a football scholarship, where he played the 1991 and 1992 seasons with the Cougars. During the 1992 Copper Bowl, he had 4 catches for 43-yards in the Cougars' 31-28 win over Utah.

Statistics
Source:

References

1969 births
Living people
American football wide receivers
American football linebackers
Fresno City Rams football players
Washington State Cougars football players
Arizona Rattlers players
San Francisco Demons players
Tampa Bay Storm players
San Jose SaberCats players
Players of American football from California
Sportspeople from Fresno, California